H. dentata may refer to:
 Hibbertia dentata, an ornamental plant species
 Hoplocorypha dentata, a praying mantis species

See also
 Dentata (disambiguation)